Lawrence John Dentico (born August 22, 1923), also known as "Larry Fab", "Little Larry" and "The Little Guy", is a New Jersey captain in the Genovese crime family and a former consigliere.

Dentico was born in Seaside Park, New Jersey, the son of Vito Antonio Dentico and Rose. He is the brother of Joseph born November 5, 1898 in Gioia del Colle in the south Italian region of Apulia and is the brother-in-law to Theresa Romano, the wife of his brother Joseph.
In 1949 and in 1952, Dentico served brief prison sentences for selling heroin. During the 1950s, Dentico worked for boss Vito Genovese. In 1957, authorities suspected that Dentico provided the murder weapon and getaway car in the shooting death of mobster Johnny Earle. In 1966, Dentico was arrested for loansharking and extortion rackets in Hoboken, New Jersey.

When Vincent "the Chin" Gigante became family boss in 1981, Dentico was working as a top aide in New Jersey to Louis Manna, the former consigliere. In 1981, Dentico was convicted of fraud and conspiracy involving the bribing of officials in Union City, New Jersey, to rig bids on public construction contracts and served a six-year prison sentence. After Gigante went to prison for racketeering in 1997, Dentico and Genovese mobster Frank Illiano formed a two-man ruling panel of street bosses to operate the family.
In August 2005, Dentico and other Genovese mobsters were indicted on charges of extortion conspiracy and conspiracy to commit murder. The defendants were accused of participating in loansharking, sports bookmaking, numbers running, and football-ticket gambling. Dentico pleaded guilty and on August 16, 2006  was sentenced to 51 months in prison. On May 12, 2009, Dentico was released from prison.

References

Further reading
United States. Congress. Senate. Appropriations Committee. Treasury and Post Office Departments Appropriations, 1954, Hearings Before the Subcommittee of the Committee of Appropriations. 1953. 
 Mafia: The Government's Secret File on Organized Crime

External links
Lawrence Dentico Indicted - US Attorney's Office: Fourteen Arrested with Unsealing of RICO Indictment Against Genovese Crime Family Members, Associates
New York Times: Reputed Mob Chief Pleads Guilty
1010 WINS: Sentencing Day for Reputed North Jersey Mobsters

1923 births
Possibly living people
American extortionists
American gangsters of Italian descent
Consiglieri
Genovese crime family
People from Seaside Park, New Jersey